The Ramblers is the trading name of the Ramblers Association, Great Britain's leading walking charity. The Ramblers is also a membership organisation with around 100,000 members and a network of volunteers who maintain and protect the path network. The organisation was founded in 1935, and campaigns to keep the British countryside open to all.

History

Walking in the countryside, or rambling, became a popular form of recreation in the nineteenth century. For many people living in towns and cities, walking offered a welcome relief from a polluted environment and the stress of daily life in urban areas. Access to the countryside, however, was becoming more of a challenge thanks to the Enclosure movement, with many private landowners closing off their land. In response, the number of walking clubs and groups that campaigned for walkers' rights grew from the mid-nineteenth century to the 1930s.

In 1931, the National Council of Ramblers' Federations was formed because walkers felt that a national body to represent their interests was needed. On 24 April 1932, the Communist-inspired British Workers' Sports Federation, frustrated at the lack of resolve of the newly formed Ramblers, staged a mass trespass of Kinder Scout, the highest point in the Peak District. During the mass trespass, the protesters present scuffled with the Duke of Devonshire's gamekeepers and five ramblers were arrested. The National Council of Ramblers' Federations did not endorse the tactics of the trespassers. This mass trespass is often seen as the pivotal turning point in the history of the Ramblers. In 1934 the Council decided to change its name, leading to the official founding of the Ramblers' Association on 1 January 1935. The first Ramblers Association office was established in Liverpool in 1938. Ten years later the organisation began to employ a secretary, Tom Stephenson, full-time.

On 28 March 1946 the Ramblers' Association incorporated Ramblers' Association Services Limited, this was intended to operate as the commercial wing of the Ramblers' Association; specifically, to manage sales, to provide office services, establish guest houses and to organise walking tours for members at home and abroad. Ramblers' Association Services Ltd eventually became a separate entity from the Ramblers' Association, eventually becoming RWH Travel Ltd. From 1948 onwards its secretary was Tom Stephenson, who was a leading campaigner for open-country access and for the first British long-distance footpath, the Pennine Way.

Labour politician Hugh Dalton, an avid outdoorsman, served a term as president of the Ramblers Association. Dalton was an environmentalist before the term came into fashion. As Chancellor in 1946 he started the National Land Fund to resource national parks, and in 1951 as Minister of Town and Country Planning he approved the Pennine Way, which involved the creation of seventy additional miles of rights of way.

Ethos and core beliefs
The Ramblers believes that walking can have a positive impact on people's lives, and that rambling in the countryside and in urban places is a right and that it benefits everyone. It also argues that Britain's network of public paths is an invaluable part of its national heritage and that the relevant authorities have a duty to invest in them. Since its inception, the Ramblers has campaigned for rights of responsible access to all of Britain's green spaces. This helped create both the right of open access through the Countryside and Rights of Way Act 2000 to around 8% of land in England (the CRoW Act) and the England Coast Path through the Marine and Coastal Access Act 2009. In Scotland, the Land Reform (Scotland) Act 2003 codified traditional rights of access into law, and along with the Nordic countries, makes it amongst the most walking-friendly countries in Europe, with walkers having the right to access virtually all land.

The Ramblers' vision is a country where all enjoy the outdoors on foot, and benefit from the experience. Further, they believe in the importance of high quality walks for all communities, from all regardless of age and background. In the code of conduct, the organisation emphasises being welcoming, positive, empowering and environmentally responsible.

Structure
The Ramblers is a charitable company limited by guarantee, registered with the Charity Commission in England and Wales and with OSCR in Scotland. The governing body of the Ramblers is the board of trustees, which comprises up to 15 members. Under devolution agreements, substantial authority is devolved to entities in Scotland and Wales. At local level, activities for members and volunteers are organised through 485 local Groups and 59 regional Areas. Each Area and Group operates through its own constitution, but as part of the overall Ramblers organisation. The General Council is the body of formal company members of the charity that meets annually. Each Ramblers Area is entitled to appoint at least two Council members. It is registered as a charity in England, Scotland and Wales.

Achievements
Under the leadership of Tom Stephenson, the Ramblers was instrumental in securing the 1949 National Parks and Access to the Countryside Act, legislation that led to the creation of National Parks, National Trails, the definitive map of rights of way in both England and Wales, and National Nature Reserves across Great Britain. 

More recently, the Ramblers has also helped to establish national parks, most recently for the South Downs and New Forest in the early 2000s. The charity has also had a key role in establishing national trails as a concept and practically.

A long-term goal of the organisation was achieved in 2000 with the passing of The Countryside and Rights of Way Act, which grants the freedom to roam in mapped areas of open countryside in England and Wales.

The Ramblers has also been at the forefront of those campaigning for a consistent scheme of access to the whole coast of England and Wales (under the Marine and Coastal Access Act 2009) and for its implementation. The Ramblers have been successful in securing government funding in 2015 for the completion of the England Coast Path by 2020.

Increasingly Ramblers volunteer teams help to maintain footpaths across GB. The work in conjunction with local authorities has been encouraged and promoted by the organisation. This has helped maintain the Pennine Way, the Pilgrims' Way, the Saxon Shore Way, Offa's Dyke, The Ridgeway and many others routes, as well as innumerable shorter paths.

Along with the Long Distance Walkers Association, the Ramblers is recognised by Sport England as the sport governing body for "Rambling" in England.

Campaigns
Throughout its history, the Ramblers has campaigned to ensure everyone has access to well maintained and easy to access green spaces to walk in for leisure.

It has always sought to protect the rights of walkers. A notable case involved Nicholas Van Hoogstraten, the millionaire property tycoon, has had a long-standing dislike of and dispute with Ramblers. In 1992 Hoogstraten erected a barn, a gate, barbed wire fence, and refrigerators across a footpath on his country estate in East Sussex. Local Ramblers staged a protest against the erection of the fence outside the boundary of Hoogstraten's estate. On 10 February 2003, and after a 13-year battle and numerous legal proceedings, the path was finally re-opened.

Today, it continues to defend the rights of the walking public, for example by opposing proposals to criminalise trespass and opposing some planned Level Crossing closures where the diversion is not suitable, for example taking walkers on to roads without pavements.

In 2015 the Ramblers launched The Big Pathwatch to examine the state of the path network in England and Wales. 3,250 volunteers conducted the survey recorded 59,000 problems. The results found 56% of footpaths were well-kept and signposted, 35% were in need of improvement and 9% were difficult or impossible to use with 46,000 photos taken of these issues. Ramblers volunteers continuously maintain these footpaths so the public can enjoy their use freely.

The Countryside and Rights of Way Act introduced a limit for all unrecorded footpaths and bridleways created before 1949 to be recorded before 1 January 2026. The Ramblers increased its training of volunteers on how to claim lost footpaths, and launched a nationwide Don't Lose Your Way campaign to save all lost paths.

The Ramblers works to ensure that legislation governing the countryside and environment helps everyone to connect to nature. This includes green and walkable urban neighbourhoods, well-maintained and well-connected public access, signage to help people navigate through the landscape, and a rich natural environment for everyone to enjoy.

The organisation promotes good neighbourhood planning and design through its urban campaigning and seeks to increase green routes in towns and cities, such as the Walk London Routes (Capital Ring, London Loop etc) and the Manchester Green Trail Network.

The Ramblers is also active in promoting its Walking For Health schemes, aimed at encouraging people with underlying health conditions to get out walking.

The Ramblers is a part of the Walking and Cycling Alliance with a shared vision that enables collaborative campaigning across the sector.

Walking experience
Ramblers group walks are led walks organised by local Ramblers groups, some targeting specific age ranges, in particular people in their 20s and 30s and has helped attract younger members. Urban walking has resulted in specialised groups, including the Metropolitan Walkers. Walks vary in length: short distances of three to four miles (6 km); a medium range of five to six miles (10 km), or seven to nine miles (14 km); or for the more experienced ramblers, ten to fifteen miles (24 km).

Consideration is given to the difficulty of the course and the terrain, whether stiles, steep hills, and busy roads are to be crossed, and the number of members who may be expected to take part.

Ramblers members take their turn in volunteering in advance for the list of leaders of the walks. Leaders walk the designated route in order to reconnoitre it, bearing in mind that certain features of the route may change before the actual day of the walk.

The Ramblers also provides walking routes called “Ramblers Routes”. The collection of routes includes many different types of walks, all featuring digital maps. Routes include detailed directions, points of interest and elevation profiles.

See also

Backpacking (hiking)
Freedom to roam
Hiking
National Cycle Network
Right of way
Trail
Walking
Walking in London
Walking in the United Kingdom
Youth Hostels Association (England & Wales) and Scottish Youth Hostels Association

References

External links

London Strollers
Walk: the Magazine of the Ramblers
Ramblers re-branding, CorpComms magazine

Hiking organizations
Charities based in the United Kingdom
English coast and countryside
Scottish coast and countryside
Welsh coast and countryside
Walking in the United Kingdom
Organizations established in 1935
1935 establishments in the United Kingdom